Malvern Hill Barnum (September 3, 1863 – February 18, 1942) was an American army officer, Brigadier general, and Major general active during World War I.

Early life 
Barnum was born in Syracuse, New York. He was named after the Battle of Malvern Hill, where his father Henry A. Barnum had been gravely wounded the previous year. In 1886, he graduated number forty-two of seventy-seven from the United States Military Academy.

Career 
After graduating, Barnum was commissioned in the Third Cavalry. In 1893, he became a distinguished graduate of the Infantry and Cavalry School and was on duty at Rock Island Arsenal from 1893 to 1894.

In the Santiago campaign, he was adjutant of the Tenth Cavalry and was wounded on July 2, 1898, at San Juan Hill.

From 1899 to 1902, Barnum was assistant quartermaster at the United States Military Academy. For four years, he was aide to General J. Weston in the Philippines, and from 1910 to 1911 he was adjutant of the Eighth Cavalry. In 1915, Barnum graduated from Army War College and was on General Staff duty until 1917.

On October 31, 1917, he was made a brigadier general of the National Army and took command of the 183rd Infantry Brigade, 92nd Division. From December 1918 to July 1919, he was the chief of the American section of the Inter-Allied Armistice Commission. From 1920 to 1923, Barnum commanded the Disciplinary Barracks at Fort Leavenworth, Kansas. On February 9, 1923, he became a brigadier general and was given command of the 18th Infantry Brigade. Barnum became a major general on June 12, 1927 and retired the following September.

Barnum was commander of the Massachusetts and national commander of the Loyal Legion.

Awards 
Barnum was awarded the Distinguished Service Medal and the Purple Heart from the United States, commander of the Legion of Honor from France, commander of the Order of the Bath from Britain, commander of the Order of Leopold and Croix de Guerre from Belgium, and the Order of Saints Maurice and Lazarus from Italy.

Death and legacy 
Malvern Hill Barnum died in Brookline, Massachusetts at the age of seventy-eight on February 18, 1942. He was interred at the West Point Cemetery on February 21, 1942.

References

Bibliography 
"Commander-in-Chief Major General Malvern Hill Barnum". MOLLUS—Commander-in-Chief Major General Malvern Hill Barnum. Military Order of the Loyal Legion of the United States, n.d. Web. August 12, 2016.
Davis, Henry Blaine. Generals in Khaki. Raleigh, NC: Pentland Press, 1998.  
Marquis Who's Who, Inc. Who Was Who in American History, the Military. Chicago: Marquis Who's Who, 1975.  
Pershing, John J., and John T. Greenwood. 2013. My life before the World War: 1860-1917; a memoir. Lexington, Kentucky: Univ. Press of Kentucky.

External links 

1863 births
1942 deaths
United States Military Academy alumni
Military personnel from Syracuse, New York
American military personnel of the Spanish–American War
United States Army War College alumni
United States Army generals of World War I
Recipients of the Distinguished Service Medal (US Army)
Recipients of the Croix de guerre (Belgium)
United States Army generals
Burials at West Point Cemetery